Keith Hackshall (23 December 1927 – 21 February 1992) was an Australian fencer. He competed at the 1956 and 1960 Summer Olympics.

References

1927 births
1992 deaths
Australian male fencers
Olympic fencers of Australia
Fencers at the 1956 Summer Olympics
Fencers at the 1960 Summer Olympics
Sportspeople from Sydney
20th-century Australian people